BeerTender is a home keg-tapping system manufactured by Krups in a joint venture with Dutch brewer Heineken.

External links

Beer vessels and serving